This is a list of lighthouses in Croatia. They are located both on the mainland and on the numerous Croatian islands in the Adriatic. The principal lights and lighthouses of Croatia are operated and maintained by Plovput a state owned company. Plovput lists 46 separate lighthouses, although there are numerous additional towers, lights and beacons.



Lighthouses

Other lighthouses

A total of 122 lighthouses are included in the lists produced by the University of North Carolina, which includes those shown in the main list, and a number of smaller lights. In some cases inactive lighthouses have been replaced by an adjacent post light. Examples include Daksa, Rt Blaca and  Negrit.

See also
 Lists of lighthouses and lightvessels

References

External links

 

Lists of lighthouses
Lighthouse
Lighthouses